Ziarat (Urdu and ) is a town is located in Lower Chitral District, Khyber Pakhtunkhwa Province of Pakistan.

Geography
This place is situated in Chitral, N.W.F.P., Pakistan, its geographical coordinates are 35° 40' 26" North, 71° 55' 28" East and its original name is Ziārat. It has surface elevation about 1800m.

Climate
Ziarat has Koppen-Geiger Weather is cold in this place in winter it plummet to 0°C and in Summer weather reaches 27°C summers are shorts with tropical weather

Demographics
Khowar, is main language Pashto Is second language Urdu is also spoken as National language.

See also
Ziarat, Balochistan

Reference

Lower Chitral District